Barbara Avalon Baker  (born 31 March 1958) is an Australian barrister and former judge, who is the 29th and current governor of Tasmania since 16 June 2021. She served on the Federal Circuit Court of Australia from 2008 to 2021.

Early life
Baker was born on 31 March 1958 in Hobart, Tasmania, and raised in Sandy Bay. Her parents were Alison Burton, a tennis player, and Bob Baker, a lawyer who became a Liberal member of the Tasmanian Parliament. Baker studied arts and law at the University of Tasmania, graduating in 1980 (BA, LLB). She represented Tasmania in tennis and field hockey at under-18 level.

Career
Baker was admitted to the legal profession in 1983. She joined Simmons Wolfhagen as a solicitor and later worked for the Office of the Solicitor-General. In 1993 she became the first female partner at Murdoch Clarke. As a lawyer Baker "specialised in family law and relationship matters". She served on the executive of the Law Society of Tasmania (1995–1996) and as president of the Family Law Practitioners' Association (2002).

In 2008, Baker was appointed to the Federal Magistrates Court of Australia, the first Tasmanian woman to serve on the court. In 2013 the court was renamed the Federal Circuit Court and its members received the title "judge" rather than magistrate. She retired from the judiciary in January 2021 and returned to practise as a barrister at Burbury Chambers.

Governor of Tasmania
In May 2021, Premier Peter Gutwein announced that Baker would succeed Kate Warner as governor of Tasmania with effect from 16 June. She stated that she would "focus on gender equality and family violence issues in the community", as well as encouraging participation in sport and acting as a role model for young lawyers. She also said that her personal views on the monarchy or republicanism were not relevant to the position.

In the 2021 Queen's Birthday Honours she was appointed a Companion of the Order of Australia.

Personal life
Baker is married to Don Chalmers, AO, an emeritus professor of law at the University of Tasmania, and has two daughters.

Baker captained Tasmania in indoor hockey and is a former national singles and doubles champion in real tennis.

References

Living people
Companions of the Order of Australia
Governors of Tasmania
Judges of the Federal Circuit Court of Australia
Australian barristers
Australian real tennis players
University of Tasmania alumni
Australian female field hockey players
Year of birth missing (living people)
People from Hobart
1958 births